Butidrine (INN) (brand names Betabloc, Butidrate, Recetan), or butedrine or butydrine, also known as hydrobutamine or idrobutamine, is a beta blocker related to pronethalol and propranolol that was developed in the 1960s. Similarly to certain other beta blockers, butidrine also possesses local anesthetic properties.

References

Phenylethanolamines
Beta blockers
Local anesthetics
Tetralins
Sodium channel blockers